Edegarike (transl. Guts) is a 2012 Indian Kannada crime drama film directed by Sumana Kittur. It is based on the novel of the same name written by Agni Shridhar and stars Aditya in the lead role, while Atul Kulkarni, Achyuth Kumar, Srujan Lokesh, Dharma and Aakanksha Mansukhani play supporting roles.

The film is based on the real-life incidents that occurred in the 1990s and is about cult figures in the Karnataka underworld such as Sridhar, Muthappa Rai and Bachchan. The film opened to widespread critical acclaim upon theatrical release. It won the Special Jury Award at the 6th Bangalore International Film Festival.

Plot
Sona is a hitman, who works under Bhai in Dubai. One day, Sona meets a social worker where the two fall for each other after many meetings. From Bhai's advisor Tukaram Shetty, Sona completes various assignments for Bhai, including killing his mentor Dholakia, where he hides himself in Bangalore. However, Rashmi gets captured by Crime Branch Inspector J. Nayak where she learns about Sona's true profession.

Rashmi calls Sona and tells him to surrender to the police. Sona relucantly agrees and decides to retire from the crime syndicate by surrendering to the police and lead a peaceful life with Rashmi. Bhai learns about this and hires Muthappanna to eliminate Sona. Muthappanna hires Sridhar Murthy and Bachchan for the job, where they arrive in Bangalore and meets Sona. However, Sridhar learns that the cops are hunting for Sona and police protection has been increased by the city's newly appointed police commissioner where the duo, along with Sona escape to a dense forest.

After learning Sona's past, Sridhar  feels guilty and decide to help Sona escape from Bhai's wrath, but is opposed by Bachchan. During a chat in the afternoon, Sona reveals that he already knew that Sridhar and Bachchan were hired by Bhai to kill him and is ready to die. Learning that Sridhar is hesitant to kill Sona due to their friendship, Bachchan kills Sona while Sridhar walks away and receives a call from Rashmi on Sona's phone, where Sridhar lies about Sona getting killed in an accident (Sona gave his phone and told Sridhar to lie about his death to Rashmi as his last wish). After this, Sridhar writes a book about Sona titled Edegarike.

Cast
 Aditya as Sona
 Atul Kulkarni as Sridhar Murthy
 Aakanksha Mansukhani as Rashmi
 Achyuth Kumar as Tukaram Shetty
 Sharath Lohitashwa as Anthony "Kalia"
 Dharma as Muthappanna
 Srujan Lokesh as Bachchan
 Chi. Guru Dutt as Dholakia
 Ramakrishna as Rashmi's father
 P. Ravi Shankar as Crime Branch Police Inspector J. Nayak

Production

Development
Edegarike was a crime novel written by journalist Agni Shridhar in the early 2000s about the India Mafia circling around Mumbai and Bangalore headed a mafia leader from Dubai. The novel had been a chart topper for several weeks and proved a hit among readers. Since then, around 15 attempts were made to adapt it into a film. Following this, Sumana Kittur who had earlier directed Slum Bala and Kallara Santhe took up the project.

Casting and filming
Following the announcement of the film in October 2010, reports said Kishore would be playing one of the three lead roles of mafia dons in the film. Bhavana had been signed in to play the female lead in the film. However, she had to back out due to health grounds, a role that eventually went to Aakanksha Mansukhani, who had earlier appeared and won praise for her performance in the 2011 Kannada film Olave Mandhara. Aditya was then signed in to play the lead role in the film, with Srujan Lokesh to play a supporting character. Filming that began in late-2011 continued for a period of 35 days in places such as Bangalore, Sakleshpur, Mangalore. It completed in June 2012.

Soundtrack

Sadhu Kokila composed music for the film's soundtrack, and the lyrics were written by Sumana Kittur. The album consists of one soundtrack. Kokila also sung the track.

Release and reception

Screenings
As a part of screening marking 100 years of Indian cinema, Edegarike was screened at the Puerto Rico Film Institute in 2013. It was then screened at the first edition of the Mumbai Women's International Film Festival in October 2013, as the only Indian film. Following this the film was screened at the 6th edition of the Bangalore International Film Festival in January 2014, where it was awarded the Special Jury Award.

Critical reception
Upon release, Edegarike opened to positive reviews from critics and audience with praise towards the film's direction, writing, cast performances and technical aspects.

G. S. Kumar of The Times of India reviewed the film giving it a rating of four out of five and wrote, "Gripping narration and excellent screenplay with a touch of romance make the story quite interesting." He concluding writing praises of the performances of actors playing pivotal roles in the film". Shruti I. L. From DNA wrote, "The film remains loyal to the book and comes only with a few changes that are needed to cater to cinematic sensibilities. The script and screenplay is aptly supported by hard hitting and thought provoking dialogues" and added, "Director Suman Kittur has managed to extract stellar performances from each of her actors. Lead actors Adithya and Atul Kulkarni steal the show with their understated acts." B S Srivani from Deccan Herald wrote "The dialogues emphasise this tension very well. Rakesh’s camerawork is excellent. Sadhu Kokila single-handedly lends that much-needed balance to a taut drama with a soulful rendition of Kittur’s lyrics. A clean effort. Reserved for a leisurely watch when pondering over life’s mechanics".

Awards

See also
 List of crime films
 India Mafia

References

External links
 

2012 films
Indian crime drama films
2012 crime drama films
Films based on short fiction
Films based on Indian novels
Films based on organized crime novels
Films about organised crime in India
2010s Kannada-language films
Films directed by Sumana Kittur